Photodotis is a genus of moth in the family Gelechiidae.

Species
 Photodotis abachausi Janse, 1958
 Photodotis adornata Omelko, 1993
 Photodotis palens Omelko, 1993
 Photodotis pellochroa Janse, 1960
 Photodotis photinopa (Meyrick, 1920)
 Photodotis prochalina Meyrick, 1911
 Photodotis spilodoma Meyrick, 1918

References

 
Anomologinae